Tawang is a town and administrative headquarters of the Tawang district in the Indian state of Arunachal Pradesh.

Tawang may also refer to:

Tawang district, administrative district of the Arunachal Pradesh state in northeastern India
Tawang (state constituency)

See also
 Twang (disambiguation)